Stone Age Complication is an EP  by Queens of the Stone Age containing six B-sides and covers.

Track listing

References

Queens of the Stone Age albums
2004 EPs
Interscope Records EPs